The Judeo-Masonic conspiracy is an anti-Semitic and anti-Masonic conspiracy theory involving an alleged secret coalition of Jews and Freemasons. These theories were popular on the far-right, particularly in France, Spain, Portugal, Italy, Germany, Russia, Serbia, Eastern Europe, and Japan, with similar allegations still being published.

The Protocols of the Elders of Zion
The Judeo-Masonic conspiracy theory merges two older strains of conspiracy claims: anti-Masonic conspiracy claims and anti-Semitic conspiracy claims. It was heavily influenced by publication of The Protocols of the Elders of Zion, a fabricated document that appeared in the Russian Empire purporting to be an exposé of a worldwide Jewish conspiracy. The Protocols claim that the Jews had infiltrated Freemasonry and were using the fraternity to further their aims. Adherents of the Judeo-Masonic conspiracy took the claim made by the Protocols to extremes and claimed that the leaders of Freemasonry and the leaders of the Jewish plot were one and the same.

An example was the Spanish Roman Catholic priest Juan Tusquets Terrats, whose Orígenes de la revolución española and other works built on the Protocols, which he translated, to claim that Jews used Freemasons and communists to undermine Christian and Spanish civilisation, providing a justification for the Francoist regime, which expanded the threat to an international Judeo-Masonic-Communist conspiracy (see also: Jewish Bolshevism).

Conceptual influence
According to Danny Keren (a member of the Department of Computer Science at Haifa University), the "conceptual inspiration" of the Protocols of the Elders of Zion was the 1797 treatise, Memoirs Illustrating the History of Jacobinism by the French priest Augustin Barruel, which claimed the Revolution was a Masonic-led conspiracy with the aim of overthrowing the moral teachings of the Roman Catholic Church. According to Keren, "in his treatise, Barruel did not himself blame the Jews, who were emancipated as a result of the Revolution. However, in 1806, Barruel circulated a fabricated letter, probably sent to him by members of the state police opposed to Napoleon Bonaparte's liberal policy toward the Jews, calling attention to the alleged part of the Jews in the conspiracy he had earlier attributed to the Masons. This myth of an international Jewish conspiracy reappeared later on in 19th century Europe in places such as Germany and Poland."

According to the Grand Lodge of British Columbia and Yukon website: "While it is both simplistic and specious to lay the responsibility for the French Revolution at the door of Freemasonry, there is no question that freemasons, as individuals, were active in building, and rebuilding, a new society. Considering the large number of bodies claiming masonic authority, many men identified today as freemasons were probably unaware of each other's masonic association and clearly cannot be seen as acting in concert. Yet they did share certain beliefs and ideals."

French Masonry of the time was exclusive, denying initiation to Jews, along with many other classes of people.

Barry Domvile and The Link
Retired admiral Barry Domvile, the founder of a British pro-Nazi association, The Link, coined the title "Judmas" for the alleged Judeo-Masonic conspiracy. Domvile claimed that the "activities of Judmas are confined to a small section of both Jews and Masons: the large majority have no idea of the work undertaken behind the façade of Judmas." Domvile alleged that "the aim of these international Jews is a World state kept in subjection by the power of money, and working for its Jewish masters" and that "Masonry is the executive partner for the conduct of Jewish policy."

Domvile said that he first started thinking about a Jewish-Masonic theory as a result of Hitler. Domvile referred both to The Protocols of the Elders of Zion, and to The Secret Powers Behind Revolution by viscount Léon de Poncins. Domvile was aware that The Protocols of the Elders of Zion had been denounced as a forgery, but regarded their authorship as "immaterial".

Post-Soviet Russia
The Judeo-Masonic conspiracy theories found new currency among the various marginal political forces in post-Soviet Russia, where widespread destitution created fertile ground for conspiracy theories, combined with blood libel and Holocaust denial. An opinion poll conducted in Moscow circa 1990 has shown that 18% of Moscow residents believed that there is Zionist conspiracy against Russia and further 25% did not exclude such a possibility.

Link to the Bilderberg group
Contemporary conspiracy theorists, who hew to theories centered on the Bilderberg Group and an alleged impending New World Order, often draw upon older concepts found in the Jewish-Masonic conspiracy theory, frequently blaming the Rothschild family or "international bankers". Because of the use of themes and tropes traditionally viewed as antisemitic, these contemporary conspiracy theorists tend to draw the ire of groups sensitive to antisemitic terminology, such as the Anti-Defamation League.

In mass culture
 The conspiracy is mentioned in Umberto Eco's novel The Prague Cemetery.

Gallery

See also
 Andinia Plan
 Anti-Masonry
 Anti-Marxism
 Anti-communism
 Anti-semitism
 Antisemitic canard
 Great Seal of the United States
 Jewish Bolshevism
 Synarchism

References

Citations

Sources

Further reading
Admiral Sir Barry Domvile KBE, CB, CMG, From Admiral to Cabin Boy, Boswell Publishing, London, 1947.
Peter Knight, Conspiracy Theories in American History: An Encyclopedia, ABC-CLIO, 2003, 
Vicomte Léon de Poncins, The Secret Powers Behind Revolution, Boswell Publishing, London, 1929.
Richard Giffiths, Patriotism Perverted, Captain Ramsay and the Far Right Club and British Anti-Semitism 1939–40, Constable & Co., London, 1998, online at Google Books

External links
 "The Judeo-Masonic Conspiracy"

Alt-right
Anti-Masonry
Anti-Marxism
Antisemitic canards
Anti-communism
Conspiracy theories involving Jews
Conspiracy theories involving race and ethnicity
Conspiracy theories involving religion
Far-right politics
Francoist Spain
Italian Fascism
Nazi Germany
Right-wing antisemitism